George Vincent McLaughlin (May 20, 1887 – December 7, 1967) was superintendent of the New York State Banking Department in 1920. He was the New York City Police Commissioner from 1926 to 1927 and president of the Brooklyn Trust Company in 1940; and vice chairman of the Triborough Bridge and Tunnel Authority. McLaughlin was of Irish American heritage.

Biography
He was born on May 20, 1887. He served as the New York City Police Commissioner from January 1, 1926 to  April 12, 1927.

Time magazine wrote on August 23, 1926:
Last week Detective John Singer of Manhattan arrested a buck Negro for stealing a car, bought him some sandwiches and coffee, took him to Police Headquarters. It was hot. Officer Singer removed his coat, sat down to fill out the prisoner's pedigree card. Suddenly Negro Pierce snatched a revolver from Officer Singer's hip pocket, shot him three times to the death, escaped. One Kuku, a witness, was the only other person in the room. Later Murderer Pierce was captured in the Bowery after a taxicab chase. He told the police: "I shot the detective; I'm sorry." Manhattanites were shocked. John Singer was the sixth police-man to be killed on duty since January 1, 1926; eleven others had been shot, merely wounded. Police Commissioner George V. McLaughlin emitted a soothing statement: "We are getting all the bad breaks so far. The police are making splendid arrests, but the luck is against them."

George, as president of the Brooklyn Trust Company brought Walter O'Malley into the financial arrangements for Ebbets Field in 1940. In 1947 he was awarded an honorary degree from Fordham University. He was a delegate to the 1952 Democratic National Convention for the 17th District. McLaughlin was a member of Robert Moses's Triborough Bridge and Tunnel Authority.

He died on December 7, 1967.

References

1887 births
1967 deaths
American people of Irish descent
Brooklyn Dodgers
Businesspeople from Brooklyn
Businesspeople from New York City
New York City Police Commissioners